Club de Fútbol Extremadura was a Spanish football team based in Almendralejo, in the autonomous community of Extremadura. Founded in 1924, it played two seasons in La Liga, and held home games at Estadio Francisco de la Hera, with a capacity of 11,580 seats. The club folded in 2010 following several years of financial problems.

History
Extremadura was founded in 1924, and spent the first 30 years of its existence in the regional leagues, promoting to the second division after winning the regional championship in the third.

The club lasted seven seasons in the category, finishing in fifth position in the 1958–59 season. Subsequently, the following 29 years were spent in the third level – in 1977 it became the fourth, after the creation of Segunda División B – with the addition of three relegations to the regional championships.

In 1990, after finishing first, Extremadura promoted to division three. Four years later, after winning its group, it returned to the second after an absence of 34 years; during that period of time, football in the region of Extremadura experienced a rise, with CD Badajoz and CP Mérida also competing in that level in the mid-1990s.

Extremadura finished in fifth position in the 1995–96 campaign. However, Real Madrid Castilla was ineligible for the playoffs, and Extremadura took its place, achieving promotion to La Liga for the first time ever after disposing of Albacete Balompié 2–0 on aggregate – Iosu Ortoundo was the manager.

The first season in the top flight was difficult as expected: the team lost its first nine matches and only won one of the first 19, but eventually recovered, finishing only one point from the safety zone. In the following year, with a young Rafael Benítez in charge, immediate promotion back was easily attained, as runner-up.

In the 1998–99 season Extremadura finished in 17th position, and the second top flight campaign also ended in relegation, after losing in the playoffs against Rayo Vallecano. The club's financial situation was precarious, and it dropped another division in 2002; in the first season in level three, a fifth position meant a narrow miss in the subsequent promotion playoffs, and the following four years were also spent in the division, with the club never finishing higher than tenth.

After the regular season in 2006–07, Extremadura faced UD Pájara Playas de Jandía from the island of Fuerteventura in the relegation playoffs: after a 0–3 away loss, a 1–1 home draw returned the club to the fourth division, after 17 years. Shortly afterwards it emerged that the club could not settle its economic problems, with players being due several months in wages. After confirmation by the Royal Spanish Football Federation on 1 August 2008, the club was relegated a further category.

Extremadura's sporting and financial troubles continued in the following years, with the club never ranking higher than 16th. In August 2010 it folded, being dissolved by its major shareholder, the Almendralejo City Hall; that fate had already befallen Mérida, with Badajoz being saved in the last minute, replaced by another team in the city and being dropped to level four.

Season to season

|valign="top" width=0%|

|}
{|
|valign="top" width=0%|

|valign="top" width=0%|

2 seasons in La Liga
13 seasons in Segunda División
9 seasons in Segunda División B
26 seasons in Tercera División

Stadium
CF Extremadura's first permanent ground was called Campo de Santa Aurora, which was located on Camino Alange. It was used from 1928 to 1935, when the club moved to nearby Campo Santa Elvira.

In 1950, the idea of building a municipal stadium was formed, and the club moved to a plot of land adjacent to the proposed stadium. For just over one season, it played at the site, called Los Cañizos. On 12 October 1951, Extremadura played Sevilla FC in the inaugural match at the new grounds, Estadio Francisco de la Hera. The stadium remained relatively unchanged until 1996, when it was demolished to make way for a revamped one, with and a seated capacity of 11,580.

Famous players
Note: this list includes players that have played at least 100 league games and/or have reached international status.

 José Basualdo
 Fernando D'Amico
 Carlos Duré
 Ronny Gaspercic
 Renaldo
 Raymond Kalla
 Carlos Navarro Montoya
 Ahmed Ouattara
  Iván Zarandona
 Virgilio Ferreira
 Quique Estebaranz
 Ito
 Juanito
 Kiko
 Óscar Montiel
 Pedro José
  Pier
 Poli
 Antonio Esposito
 Víctor López

Famous coaches
 Rafael Benítez
 Josu Ortuondo

References

External links
Official website 
Unofficial website 

 
Association football clubs established in 1924
Association football clubs disestablished in 2010
Defunct football clubs in Extremadura
1924 establishments in Spain
2010 disestablishments in Spain
Segunda División clubs
La Liga clubs